A sports analyst is a person looking through technical, tactical, physiological, and psychological performance metrics [1] working with the sports coach and sports science team to improve athlete performance. They will often use Video motion analysis to help with data collection. Sports commentators or journalists also analyze elements of sports performance, for media companies such as ESPN, NBC Sports, CBS Sports Network, Turner Sports, and ABC.

A sports analyst may perform different jobs within the field and may even hold more than one position at once. A sports journalist reports to the public in the form of writing and includes information about sporting topics, events, and competitions. A sports commentator and sportscaster give play-by-play details of a specific sporting event and game. They also relay information necessary to understand the context of that specific sport.[2] Notable sports commentators include Joe Buck, Brent Musburger, and Max Kellerman.

Sports analysts are typically former athletes and coaches from their respective sports. Sometimes, a sports analyst will cover a sport, even though they have not played that sport previously. An example is Brad Daugherty, who played professional basketball but covers NASCAR racing.

History 
This is about the history of the sports analyst profession. For a history of sports analytics, see sports analytics.

Henry Chadwick, nicknamed the "Father of Baseball", is one of the earliest recorded sports analysts. Chadwick’s contributions to sports analytics originated from a love of baseball. He fell in love with the sport at the beginning of the 20th century and became involved in any way that he could. Chadwick held positions on baseball rules committees to help mold the sport into what it is today.

Chadwick is acknowledged for his many contributions to baseball statistics. He created box scores in addition to the statistics of batting average and earned run average (ERA).

Before his invention, sports columnists resorted to tallying runs scored. Though he was an amateur statistician, Chadwick’s batting average statistic better captured a batter’s skills. Earned run average (ERA) made a distinction between errors and skill.

Chadwick’s baseball box score[3] was based on the cricket scorecard. It debuted in an issue of the Clipper in 1859. The scorecard was a 9x9 grid. Chadwick had numbers representing defensive positions and this method of scorekeeping is present to this day.

Up until the early 1800s, sports journalism was reserved for the social elite. The high price of newspapers made it so only those of high economic status could afford it. Due to the invention of the penny press and the adoption of mass production throughout the United States, newspapers became more affordable for the common man. With newspapers more widely accessible, the demand for sports journalism quickly began to rise.

The rise of sports media 
During the 1900s, baseball became the national pastime of the United States. Media coverage of sports rapidly increased, specifically in New York.[4] The first newspapers with a reoccurring sports section and a dedicated sports department were the New York Herald and The New York respectively.[5]

In the mid to late 1800s, newspapers only dedicated 0.4 percent of their page to sports or sports-related topics. A little over a half-century later, that percentage rose to 20 percent.[6]

Technological advancements, such as the television and the internet, helped change the coverage of sports to statistical analysis instead of play-by-plays and general summaries. Player interviews also became more common.

Advancements in print also contributed to the coverage of sports.[6] Sports Illustrated was founded in 1954. Sports Illustrated’s release schedule allowed the writers to study the games thoroughly and host detailed interviews with players, coaches, and sports analysts.[7]

Modern-day 
A dominant sports analyst in 2022 is Stephen A. Smith, “a featured commentator on ESPN’s First Take weekdays from 10 a.m. to 12 p.m. ET, discussing and debating the sports topics of the day (since 2012), an analyst on NBA Countdown, ESPN and ABC’s longstanding NBA pregame show (since 2021), and host of NBA in Stephen A’s World, an alternate presentation to accompany select ESPN NBA games throughout the season (since 2022).” This is someone who did not play professional sports but played college basketball. He now is a sports analyst for all sports, not just basketball.

Worldly View 
With there being a vast difference in amount of sports heavily covered in the United states as other parts of the world the sports analytics is more centralized on sports like football/soccer and cricket. There are shows and channels that cover sports such as Eurosport. However American companies such as ESPN have parts of their networks that cover sports outside North America.

Education 
A sports analyst's education may include a Bachelor of Journalism or sport communication and master's programs with concentrations in sports reporting. Common courses include news reporting, media ethics, sports psychology, and magazine writing.[8]

Types of sports analysts 
There are two sides to sports analysts, those who are employed by companies, such as ESPN and other sports broadcast channels, and those who are hired by teams. The analysts on broadcast channels work with automated data feeds and use manual data entry to ensure the delivery of accurate, timely, and insightful sports data. Sports data analysts also are responsible for helping turn stats into digestible storylines. They must be able to recognize statistical events that help explain why a team won or lost.

The sports analysts who are hired by sports teams to help enhance performance collect and analyze training data from individual athletes. They then develop efficient training programs aimed at improving their performance. During a game or competition, a sports analyst will be assisting a coach with the proper decisions to make for the team’s best outcome.

Salary 
The salary of a sports analyst has a very large margin. The national average sits at $61,145 (Zip recruiter) annually as of October 2022. Some sports analysts make as much as $21,000 a year but have a potential yearly salary of 17 million dollars depending on their level and recognition.

The number of sports analyst jobs is predicted by the Bureau of Labor Statistics to decrease by 9% between 2014 and 2024.[8]

Sports Analytics Platforms 

There are sports analytic platforms that act as your personal sports analyst and coach. Professional athletes are also known to endorse these products and use them for their benefit.

Whoop: “An American wearable technology company headquartered in Boston, Massachusetts. Its principal product is a fitness tracker that measures strain, recovery, and sleep. The device is best known for its use by athletes.”

Hudl: “See the game differently. We're changing the way teams around the world capture, organize, analyze and learn from film and data.”

See also 
 Sports commentator

 List of sports announcers

 Sports analytics

 Sports journalism

 Sports radio

 Sports television

 Sports broadcasting

References

1.     "What is Performance Analysis in Sport?". Retrieved 20221-11-19

"What Are the Responsibilities of a Sports Analyst?". Retrieved 13 November 2022

3.      His Hall of Fame plaque states, in part: "Inventor of the box score. Author of the first rule-book ... Chairman of rules committee in first nationwide baseball organization." Lederer, Rich. By the Numbers: Computer technology has deepened fans' passion with the game's statistics. Memories and Dreams (Vol. 33, No. 6; Winter 2011[-2012], pp. 32-34). National Baseball Hall of Fame official magazine.

4.     Summer, Jim (January 1, 2004). "Sports in the 1920s: The Golden age of Sports". ncpedia.org. NCpedia (State Library of North Carolina). Retrieved November 14, 2022.

5.      Motiz, Brian (December 2014). Rooting for the story: Institutional sports journalism in the digital age (Thesis). Syracuse University.

OCLC476454

7.     "Sports Illustrated, The Magazine That Popularized Sports". historylessons.net. Retrieved 2022-11-11.

"Sports Analyst Degrees". Retrieved 13 November 2022

9.     “How Sports Analytics Are Used Today, by Teams and Fans”. Builtin, https://builtin.com/big-data/big-data-companies-sports

10.  “Sports Analyst Salary”. Zip Recruiter, Nov,2022. https://www.ziprecruiter.com/Salaries/Sports-Analyst-Salary

11.  Indeed Editorial Team. “What Is Sports Analytics? (Definition, Importance, and Tips)”. Indeed, https://ca.indeed.com/career-advice/finding-a-job/what-is-sports-analytics#:~:text=Companies%20employ%20sports%20analysts%20to,aimed%20at%20improving%20their%20performance.

12.  “Stephen A. Smith”. ESPN Press Room, 2022. https://espnpressroom.com/us/bios/stephen-a-smith/

Sports journalism

Sports mass media people